Devwrat Singh (3 June 1969 – 4 November 2021) was an Indian politician and a member of the Janta Congress Chhattisgarh political party.

He was a member of the 14th Lok Sabha of India, representing the Rajnandgaon constituency of Chhattisgarh. From 1995 to 1998 he was member of Madhya Pradesh Legislative Assembly. From 1998 to 2003 he was again elected to MP legislative Assembly later Chhattisgarh Legislative Assembly. He was elected to it again in 2003.

He was married to Vibha Singh and had one son and two daughters.

In February 2018, he joined Janta Congress Chhattisgarh of Ajit Jogi and was elected to the Chhattisgarh Legislative Assembly from Khairagarh in the 2018 Chhattisgarh Legislative Assembly election as a member of the Janta Congress Chhattisgarh.

Singh died on 4 November 2021, due to heart attack, from post Covid-19 complications, at the age of 52.

References

1969 births
2021 deaths
People from Rajnandgaon
India MPs 2004–2009
Chhattisgarh MLAs 2018–2023
Lok Sabha members from Chhattisgarh
Janta Congress Chhattisgarh politicians
Indian National Congress politicians from Chhattisgarh
Madhya Pradesh MLAs 1998–2003
Chhattisgarh MLAs 2003–2008
Madhya Pradesh MLAs 1993–1998
Deaths from the COVID-19 pandemic in India